Donald Frederick Smerek (born December 20, 1957) is a former professional American football defensive lineman in the National Football League for the Dallas Cowboys. He played college football at the University of Nevada.

Early years
Smerek attended Basic High School, where he was an All-state player in football. He also practiced basketball.

He accepted a football scholarship from the University of Nevada, which was an NCAA Division II school. In 1978, the program moved up to Division I-AA. As a senior, he helped his team finish undefeated (11-0) in the regular season and was named All-Big Sky at defensive end.

Professional career
Smerek was signed as an undrafted free agent by the Dallas Cowboys after the 1980 NFL Draft. In training camp, he fractured his ribs and was placed on the injured reserve list.

In 1981, he was moved to defensive tackle, but suffered a knee injury in the second game of the regular season and was placed on the injured reserve list. While being inactive, he had a traffic related argument and was shot in the chest. His physical fitness helped him survive the injury and return to play football the next season.

In 1982, he was a starter for the Cowboys in the playoffs, replacing the injured John Dutton at left defensive tackle. He made his first career start in the playoffs against the Green Bay Packers, posting 10 tackles and one sack.

In 1983, he began to substitute Dutton on passing downs, finishing with 6 sacks (fourth on the team) and 17 tackles.

In 1984, although he played defensive tackle, head coach Tom Landry gave him the first shot at retired Harvey Martin's right defensive end position. But due to the holdout of Randy White, the team was forced to play him at right defensive tackle during the 4 preseason games, and he never received the opportunity to compete with Jim Jeffcoat for the starting position, nor was he able to catch up.
He remained in his role of a pass rush specialist at left defensive tackle, registering 10 tackles and one sack.

In 1985, he was competing for the left defensive tackle position, but suffered a right shoulder injury that forced him to miss training camp. He tried to play in the season opener against the Washington Redskins, but his shoulder wasn't strong enough and was placed on the injured reserve list on September 10. He returned after 6 games, making 2 sacks (came in his first game against the Atlanta Falcons) and would also match his career-high 17 tackles.

In 1986, he missed the first 5 games of the season because of a sprained knee, registering 17 tackles and 4.5 sacks.

In 1987, he was placed on the injured reserve list with a sprained knee, before being activated in October after the NFL players went on a strike, so he would start the 3 replacement games at defensive end. He saw most of his playing time in passing situations during the remainder of the season. He finished with 14 tackles (9 in the fifth game against the Washington Redskins).

Smerek retired after being waived on August 23, 1988. He was one of the strongest players on the team and a productive backup as a pass rushing specialist. During his career he had a chance to earn a starting position on different occasions, but untimely injuries were his downfall.

References

1957 births
Living people
People from Henderson, Nevada
Players of American football from Nevada
American football defensive linemen
Nevada Wolf Pack football players
Dallas Cowboys players
National Football League replacement players